Eilema albidella is a moth of the subfamily Arctiinae first described by Hervé de Toulgoët in 1976. It is found in Africa.

References

Moths described in 1976
albidella